In aerodynamics, compression lift refers to the increased pressure under an aircraft that uses shock waves generated by its own supersonic flight to generate lift. This can lead to dramatic improvements in lift for supersonic/hypersonic aircraft. Clarence Syvertson and Alfred J. Eggers discovered this phenomenon in 1956 as they analyzed abnormalities at the reentry of nuclear warheads.

The basic concept of compression lift is well known; "planing" boats reduce drag by "surfing" on their own bow wave in exactly the same fashion. Using this effect in aircraft is more difficult, however, because the "wake" is not generated until supersonic speeds are reached, and is highly angled. Aircraft have to be carefully shaped to take full advantage of this effect. In addition, the angle of the shock waves varies greatly with speed, making it even more difficult to design a craft that gains significant lift over a wide range of speeds.

Higher speed designs using compression lift, waveriders, remain an interesting possibility for hypersonic vehicle designs, although only testbed models have been flown. The Boeing X-51 (WaveRider) also uses compression lift.

References

External links
The Bird is on the Wing: Aerodynamics and the Progress of the American Airplane
The Story of the Boeing Company By Bill Yenne, William Yenne
Bomber R&D Since 1945: The Role of Experience By Mark A. Lorell, Alison Saunders
Hypersonic Vehicle Design 

Aerodynamics